The Lovell General Hospital East is a former hospital at Fort Devens. It was named after the first Surgeon General of the United States Army, Joseph Lovell. After its closure, it was redeveloped into the United States Army Intelligence School.

See also
 List of military installations in Massachusetts

References

Hospitals in Middlesex County, Massachusetts
Military facilities in Massachusetts
Military hospitals in the United States
Closed medical facilities of the United States Army
Defunct hospitals in Massachusetts
Fort Devens